Douglas Binnie (26 December 1890 – 20 April 1969) was a New Zealand cricketer. He played in one first-class match for Wellington in 1921/22.

See also
 List of Wellington representative cricketers

References

External links
 

1890 births
1969 deaths
New Zealand cricketers
Wellington cricketers
Cricketers from Dunedin